The 1995 Belgian Cup Final, took place on 28 May 1995 between Club Brugge and Germinal Ekeren. Club Brugge were the favorites and won its sixth Belgian Cup comfortably, by a score of 3–1. Germinal Ekeren appeared only for the second time, after first reaching the 1990 Belgian Cup Final, which was also lost.

Route to the final

Match

Details

External links
  
 RSSSF Belgium Cups 1994/95

Belgian Cup finals
Cup Final